is a Japanese footballer who plays as a midfielder. His younger brothers Kazuma Watanabe and Mitsuki Watanabe are also footballers.

Career
Watanabe left Kamatamare Sanuki at the end of 2018, where his contract expired.

Club statistics
Updated as of 23 February 2019.

References

External links

1984 births
Living people
Association football people from Nagasaki Prefecture
Japanese footballers
J1 League players
J2 League players
Kyoto Sanga FC players
Omiya Ardija players
Busan IPark players
Kamatamare Sanuki players
Association football midfielders